Rita Dionne-Marsolais (born April 20, 1947) is a former Quebec politician and economist. She was the Member of National Assembly of Quebec for the riding of Rosemont in the Montreal region and represented the Parti Québécois from 1994 to 2008.

Dionne-Marsolais went at the Université de Montréal and obtained a bachelor's degree in economics and a master's degree in econometrics. She later became an economist at Hydro-Québec and was an assistant to the company's president. She was also the vice-president in the development sector for the Société générale de financement. After being the Quebec delegate in New York, she was an economist for Price Waterhouse.

In addition, she was an administration member of the Ordre des architectes du Québec, the Quebec Bar, the Montreal Symphony Orchestra, the Saint-Luc Hospital in Montreal and the Board of Trade of Metropolitan Montreal as well as the free trade committee. She would be later involved in politics as the treasurer of the Parti Québécois.

She entered politics in 1994 and was elected in Rosemont in 1994. She held several Cabinet positions including tourism (1994–1996), culture and communications (1994–1995), industry and trade (1996–1997) and revenue (1998). After being re-elected in 1998, she was named minister for revenue (1998–1999) and natural resources (2001–2003). She was also a member of several committees and a delegate member for relations with several world regions including the Middle East and Brazil.

While the Parti Québécois lost the 2003 elections to the Liberals, she was re-elected for a third term in 2003 and for a fourth term in 2007. In late October 2008, she announced her retirement from politics becoming effective when the general elections were announced on November 5, 2008. Former Minister Louise Beaudoin is the PQ candidate.

Electoral record (partial)

References

External links
 

1947 births
Canadian women economists
French Quebecers
Living people
Parti Québécois MNAs
Politicians from Montreal
Politicians from Sherbrooke
Université de Montréal alumni
Women MNAs in Quebec
21st-century Canadian politicians
21st-century Canadian women politicians